Evgenii Igorevich Tiurnev (born 8 April 1997) is a Russian tennis player. He has career-high rankings of World No. 265 in singles achieved on 14 February 2022 and No. 291 in doubles achieved on 30 April 2018.

He has won two ATP Challengers and 14 Futures titles in singles as well as one ATP Challenger and eleven Futures titles in doubles.

Career

2017: ATP debut
He made his ATP World Tour main draw debut at the 2017 St. Petersburg Open having been granted a wildcard into the singles competition.

2021: First two Challenger titles, top 300 debut
He won the 2021 Saint Petersburg Challenger II and the 2021 Antalya Challenger IV.

Personal life
Tiurnev started playing tennis at 7.

Challenger and Futures/World Tennis Tour Finals

Singles 24 (16-8)

Doubles: 3 (1–2)

References

Sources
 
 

1997 births
Living people
Sportspeople from Moscow Oblast
People from Balashikha
Russian male tennis players
Universiade medalists in tennis
Universiade bronze medalists for Russia